This is a list of diseases of foliage plants belonging to the family Bromeliaceae.

Plant Species

Bacterial diseases

Fungal diseases

See also
List of pineapple diseases

References
Common Names of Diseases, The American Phytopathological Society

Foliage plant (Bromeliaceae)